The Russian Eight Army (8-я армия, 8А) was a World War I Russian field army that fought on the Eastern theatre of war.

Field management was established in July 1914 at the headquarters of the Kiev Military District. The unit was disbanded in the beginning of 1918. At the beginning of the war the 8th Army was composed of the VII, VIII, XII, XXIV Army Corps.

Military Fronts in which the 8th Army participated 
 Southwestern Front (July 1914 - August 1917)
 Romanian Front (August 1917 - the beginning of 1918)

Commanders
 28.07.1914 – 17.03.1916 — General of Cavalry Aleksei Brusilov
 23.03.1916 – 29.04.1917 — General of Cavalry Alexey Kaledin
 29.04.1917 – 10.07.1917 — General of Infantry Lavr Kornilov
 11.07.1917 – 25.07.1917 — Lieutenant-General Vladimir Cheremisov
 30.07.1917 – 17.10.1917 — Lieutenant-General Michai Sokownin
 18.10.1917 – 21.12.1917 — Lieutenant-General Mykola Yunakiv

See also
 List of Russian armies in World War I
 List of Imperial Russian Army formations and units

References

Armies of the Russian Empire
Military units and formations established in 1914
1914 establishments in the Russian Empire
Military units and formations disestablished in 1918